Hemilobophasma is a genus of insects in the family Mantophasmatidae. It is a monotypic genus consisting of the species Hemilobophasma montaguense, which is endemic to Western Cape Province, South Africa. Its type locality is an area near Montagu.

References

Mantophasmatidae
Monotypic insect genera
Insects of South Africa
Endemic fauna of South Africa